Beverly Glen Boulevard is one of five major routes that connect the Westside of Los Angeles to the San Fernando Valley (the other four are the San Diego (405) Freeway, Sepulveda Boulevard, Laurel Canyon Boulevard, and Coldwater Canyon Avenue.

It starts at Rancho Park Golf Course on Pico Boulevard in West Los Angeles. It proceeds to intersect with Santa Monica and Wilshire boulevards, passing near Century City, Sinai Temple and Los Angeles Country Club. The road marks the eastern border of the Westwood Prosperity Unit development built by Janss Investment Company as the foundation of the Westwood neighborhood of Los Angeles.

As the road travels further north, it intersects with Sunset Boulevard near UCLA and passes the gated communities of Bel Air and the middle school campus of the Harvard-Westlake School.  The hills through which the boulevard passes north of Sunset and south of Mulholland Drive is known as Beverly Glen. Beverly Glen runs parallel to the wealthy section of Bel-Air and its gated communities.

After passing Mulholland, Beverly Glen Boulevard swerves west and passes through the exclusive hillside homes in Sherman Oaks. "Stilt Street" is a row of twenty  stilt houses designed by architect Richard Neutra that perch on the steep hillside above the boulevard.  The road ends at Ventura Boulevard in the south end of the Valley. Commuters seeking to go further north into the Valley go one block west to Van Nuys Boulevard which spans most of the Valley's length.

Beverly Glen Boulevard is east of Sepulveda Boulevard and the San Diego Freeway (I-405). When traffic on I-405 becomes unbearable, many commuters take Beverly Glen or Sepulveda instead, causing considerable congestion on both streets.

References

Streets in Los Angeles
Streets in Los Angeles County, California
Streets in the San Fernando Valley
Boulevards in the United States
Hollywood Hills
Bel Air, Los Angeles
Rancho Park, Los Angeles
Sherman Oaks, Los Angeles
West Los Angeles
Westwood, Los Angeles
San Fernando Valley
Santa Monica Mountains